Saidur Rahman Boyati (born 1931) is a Bangladesh folk singer of Baul genre. He was awarded Shilpakala Padak in 2013 and Bangladesh National Film Award for Best Male Playback Singer in 1995.

Education
Saidur Rahman Bayati started his education at Paschim Hasli Primary School in Manikganj. [9] In 1959, he failed the matriculation examination. After that he did not study anymore.

Joining the liberation war
The war of liberation for independence started in 1971. Saidur Rahman joined the war of liberation. He used to write various songs and poems to give courage to his comrades.

Relationship with Sheikh Mujibur Rahman
At a reception given to Sheikh Mujibur Rahman in 1972, Saidur Rahman Bayati sang a song he had written about Sheikh Mujibur Rahman. Sheikh Mujibur Rahman was very happy and gave him a watch.

Family
Saidur Rahman married Saleha Begum in 1986. The couple gave birth to 3 sons and 1 daughter. Their eldest son Abul Bashar Abbasi is also a musician. He sings on radio and television.

References

External links
 

Living people
1931 births
People from Manikganj District
20th-century Bangladeshi male singers
20th-century Bangladeshi singers
Bangladeshi folk singers
Best Male Playback Singer National Film Award (Bangladesh) winners
Honorary Fellows of Bangla Academy